WQAW-LD is a low-power television station in Lake Shore, Maryland, broadcasting digitally on UHF channel 20. The station is owned by HC2 Holdings.
On or about April 21, 2022, their transmitter apparently shut down. It shares the antenna tower with (WMPT - UHF ch. 21) Maryland Public Television
which is on air at 100% signal.
Inquiry to HC2 Holdings has gone unanswered.
UHF channel 20 became active on April 21, 2022, for WDME-CD in Washington, DC. It's antenna shares the big Tenleytown tower of WRC-TV.

The callsign WQAW was previously used in Washington on an AM station licensed to Catholic University of America, which broadcast on 833 and later 1270 kHz between 1923 and 1924.

History 
The station’s construction permit was issued on June 13, 2002, under the callsign of W69EH. It was changed to WQAW-LP on July 9, 2004, and to WQAW-LD on May 28, 2020.

Digital channels

References

External links
Una Vez Mas Official site

Innovate Corp.
Television channels and stations established in 2005
2005 establishments in Maryland
QAW-LD
Low-power television stations in the United States
LX (TV network) affiliates